General Yue Fei is a Chinese historical novel written by Qian Cai in the Qing dynasty. Consist of 80 chapters, the first 61 chapters detail the life and adventures of Yue Fei, while the last 19 concern the exploits of Yue Fei's son Yue Lei after Yue Fei's unjust death.

Description
The author Qian Cai (錢彩) lived sometime during the reigns of the Kangxi and Yongzheng (1661–1735) emperors of the Qing dynasty. A dating symbol in its preface points either to the year 1684 or to 1744. It was banned during the reign of the Qianlong Emperor. There are two main versions of this novel. The original one had 80 chapters. There was an illustrated edition of this version published in 1912. The other version also had 80 chapters and was published during the reign of the Tongzhi Emperor (1861–1875).

Some people mistakenly take this novel to be historical fact when it is purely fiction. According to Sir Yang Ti-liang's introduction to his translation:

The work is a historical novel in form, but it is in fact based almost mainly on legends which were current amongst the common people for centuries. Indeed some of the events described there are nothing more than Qian Cai's own imagination.

English translation
Starting in 1964 and finishing in 1995, Sir Yang Ti-liang, former Chief Justice of Hong Kong, current Chairman of the Hong Kong Red Cross, combined the first chapters of these works (in an attempt to weed out the overabundance of supernatural elements) to create a 79-chapter version with 961 pages, which he translated into English. It was published by Joint Publishing in 1995.

Major characters

Protagonists
Yue Fei and his family
Yue Yun, Yue Fei's first son
Yue Lei, Yue Fei's second son
Zhang Xian
Niu Gao
Yang Zaixing
Gao Chong
Lu Wenlong
Wang Zuo
Zhou Tong
Huyan Zhuo
Han Shizhong
Liang Hongyu

Antagonists
Qin Hui and his wife
Wuzhu
Hamichi, Wuzhu's strategist

References

Novels set in the Northern Song
18th-century Chinese novels
Chinese historical novels
Qing dynasty novels
Chinese novels adapted into films
Chinese novels adapted into television series
Novels set in the 12th century
Novels set in Henan